Fever is a 1981 Polish drama film directed by Agnieszka Holland. It is based on a story of writer Andrzej Strug. It was entered into the 31st Berlin International Film Festival where Barbara Grabowska won the Silver Bear for Best Actress.

The film takes place during the Revolution in the Kingdom of Poland (1905–07). The film was immediately banned by the Polish Communist government upon its release, because of its brutally realistic portrayal of the occupying Russian forces.

Plot
The film is set at the beginning of the 20th century, when Poland fought for its independence.

Cast
 Barbara Grabowska - Kama
 Adam Ferency - Wojtek Kielza
 Bogusław Linda - Gryziak
 Olgierd Łukaszewicz - Leon
 Tomasz Miedzik - Kamil
 Aleksy Awdiejew - Governor's Aide (as Aleksiej Awdiejew)
 Wiktor Grotowicz - Governor's Butler
 Tadeusz Huk - Chemist
 Michal Juszczakiewicz - Michal
 Krzysztof Kiersznowski - Activist
 Marian Lacz - Kielza's Uncle
 Pawel Nowisz - Wartki
 Ryszard Sobolewski - Governor
 Michal Tarkowski - Doctor
 Krzysztof Zaleski - Czarny

References

External links

1981 films
1981 drama films
Polish historical drama films
Films set in the 1900s
Films set in the 1910s
Films set in Poland
Films shot in Poland
1980s Polish-language films
1980s historical drama films
Films directed by Agnieszka Holland